Private Resort is a 1985 American adventure comedy film directed by George Bowers, and written by Gordon Mitchell, Ken Segall and Alan Wenkus.  The film starred the then-unknown Rob Morrow in his first film  appearance, Johnny Depp in his first starring role, and Andrew Dice Clay.

Private Resort was the third in a series of comic teen sex romps from producer R. Ben Efraim, each of which had the word Private in the title. The previous two films were Private Lessons and Private School.

Plot
Johnny Depp and Rob Morrow star as Jack and Ben, respectively, teen buddies on the prowl for wealthy girls at a posh Miami resort where they are weekend guests. Also on the prowl is The Maestro (Hector Elizondo), a skilled jewel thief pursuing the diamond necklace of society woman Amanda Rawlings (Dody Goodman). When they accidentally run afoul of the Maestro, Jack and Ben suddenly have their hands full.

Cast

References

External links
 
 
 

1985 films
1985 comedy films
1980s sex comedy films
American sex comedy films
1980s English-language films
Films shot in Florida
TriStar Pictures films
Beach party films
Teen sex comedy films
1985 directorial debut films
Films directed by George Bowers
1980s American films